Shabbir Ali (born 19 September 1986) is an Indian footballer who plays as a midfielder for United Sikkim F.C. in the I-League.

Career

United Sikkim
Ali made his debut for United Sikkim F.C. on 22 September 2012 during an Indian Federation Cup match versus Salgaocar F.C. at the JRD Tata Sports Complex in Jamshedpur, Jharkhand in which he was in Starting 11; United Sikkim lost the match 0–3.

Career statistics

Club
Statistics accurate as of 12 May 2013

References

Indian footballers
1986 births
Living people
I-League players
United Sikkim F.C. players
Association football midfielders